Nemer is a surname. Notable people with the surname include:

Ivan Nemer (born 1998), Argentine rugby union player
Jerry Nemer (1912–1980), American basketball player
Mona Nemer (born 1957), Lebanese Canadian academic